Pachyphloeus depressus is a species of ascomycete fungus that forms truffle-like fruitbodies. It is found in southwestern China, where it has been reported from Qiaojia County, Yunnan Province, and Huili County, Sichuan Province. These counties are both near the Jinsha River. Fruitbodies of the fungus are smooth and greenish-brown—distinctive features in the genus Pachyphloeus. They measure  in diameter, and have a rubbery texture. When ripe, the odor of the flesh is similar to burned potatoes. Spores are spherical, measuring 15.7–20 µm with coarse rod-like spines up to 2.5 µm on the surface. The fungus has been called the "green female truffle" because of its superficial resemblance to the locally common species Tuber pseudohimalayense.

References

External links

Fungi described in 2015
Fungi of China
Pezizaceae